The men's doubles was an event on the tennis at the 1900 Summer Olympics program in Paris from 6 to 11 July. Sixteen players from 3 nations competed as eight pairs, including two mixed teams. The event was won by brothers Laurence Doherty and Reginald Doherty, defeating Max Décugis of France and Basil Spalding de Garmendia of the United States in the final. With no bronze-medal match, bronzes went to two teams: the French pair of Guy de la Chapelle and André Prévost and the British pair of Harold Mahony  Arthur Norris.

Background

This was the second appearance of the men's doubles tennis. The event has been held at every Summer Olympics where tennis has been on the program: from 1896 to 1924 and then from 1988 to the current program. A demonstration event was held in 1968.

The Doherty brothers of Great Britain were heavily favored. Reginald Doherty had just won his fourth straight The Championships, Wimbledon singles title. Laurence Doherty would later win five (1902–1906). There were some significant other players, including Max Decugis (who would win 8 French championships after the Games) and Harold Mahony (who had won Wimbledon in 1896 and the European championship in 1899), but none of the pairs opposing the Doherty brothers were considered to have a chance.

The United States and France each made their debut in the event. Great Britain made its second appearance.

Competition format

The competition was a single-elimination tournament with no bronze-medal match (both semifinal losers tied for third). All matches before the final were best-of-three sets; the final was best-of-five sets. Tiebreaks had not been invented yet.

Schedule

Draw

Draw

Results summary

References

  ITF, 2008 Olympic Tennis Event Media Guide

1900

Men's doubles
Men's events at the 1900 Summer Olympics